John 20:28 is the twenty-eighth verse of the twentieth chapter of the Gospel of John in the New Testament. It is part of a description of what the book says is Jesus' reappearance to the disciples, including Thomas, eight days after his resurrection.

Content
The original Koine Greek, according to the Textus Receptus, reads:

The transliteration of the original Koine Greek to Latin script is:
kai apekrithē ho Thōmas, kai eipen autō, Ho Kyrios mou kai ho Theos mou

In the King James Version of the Bible it is translated as:
And Thomas answered and said unto him, My Lord and my God.

The modern World English Bible translates the passage as:
Thomas answered him, "My Lord and my God!"

For a collection of other versions see BibleHub John 20:28

Analysis
In  Jesus used the term 'teacher' and 'lord' as synonyms, but here 'my Lord' is designated to the risen Christ, and 'my God' resumes Jesus' description in the Prologue as 'God' (John 1:1, 18). This is the only time in the four canonical gospels that Jesus is addressed as God.

Suetonius records that the Roman emperor Domitian (AD 81–96) wished to be addressed as dominus et deus noster, "our Lord and God", so the statement in this verse 'may on a secondary level be designed to counter Roman emperor worship'.

It is well known that the declension of the Greek words 'Lord' (Κύριός) and 'God' (Θεός) is in both cases the nominative declension. Greek, like Latin, has a vocative declension when addressing somebody.  The vocative for the word 'Lord' (Κύριε) is used 120 times in the New Testament. The words 'Lord' and 'God' used in this verse are both in the nominative declension - the declension used for the subject of a sentence or when just referring to somebody or something.

References

Sources

External links
Jesus Appears to His Disciples

20:28
John 20:28